The Embers of Time is the 11th studio album by American singer-songwriter Josh Rouse, released on April 6, 2015 on Yep Roc.

Track listing

Weekly charts

References

2015 albums
Josh Rouse albums
Yep Roc Records albums